Bećirović is a Balkan surname, derived from the name Bećir. It may refer to:

 Alma Bećirović, Bosnian filmmaker and theatre director
 Denis Bećirović (born 1975), Bosnian politician
 Esat Bečirović, Montenegrin professional ladies man
 Memi Bečirovič (born 1961), head coach of the Slovenia national basketball team from December 2009 until December 2010
 Mirnes Becirovic (born 1989), Austrian footballer
 Mirnesa Bećirović and Mirneta Bećirović (born 1991), twin Austrian martial artists of Bosnian origin
 Sani Bečirović (born 1981), Slovenian professional basketball player

See also 
 Bakirović

Bosnian surnames